Metrolinx is a Crown agency of the Government of Ontario that manages and integrates road and public transport in the Greater Toronto and Hamilton Area (GTHA), which comprises much of Ontario's Golden Horseshoe region. Headquartered at Union Station in Toronto, the agency was created as the Greater Toronto Transportation Authority on June 22, 2006. The agency adopted its present name as a brand name in 2007 and eventually as the legal name in 2009.

The agency is responsible for the Presto card, the electronic fare system used on public transport systems in the GTHA and on the OC Transpo in Ottawa. In 2009, Metrolinx assumed responsibility for GO Transit, the regional commuter rail and coach network. Metrolinx owns and operates the Union Pearson Express, the airport rail link connecting Toronto Pearson International Airport to Union Station. Metrolinx is also responsible for the construction of transit expansion projects worth nearly $30 billion in Torontoincluding Line 5 Eglinton, the Ontario Line, the Line 1 Yonge subway extension into Richmond Hill, York Region, and the Line 2 Bloor–Danforth extension into Scarboroughfollowing a 2020 agreement with the City of Toronto.

History

The Greater Toronto Transportation Authority was created by legislation and introduced in the Legislative Assembly of Ontario on April 24, 2006. The bill was passed and received royal assent on June 22, 2006. In April 2007, a transition team seconded from the Ontario Public Service began work at the GTTA's headquarters at 20 Bay Street in Toronto.

In July 2007, the GTTA identified the following first round of 'quick win' projects as candidates for early implementation:
 GO Transit rail fleet expansion
 $60.0 million for 20 new bi-level passenger coaches
 $20.0 million for track capacity expansion
 GO Transit bus fleet expansion
 $9.0 million for 10 new double-decker coaches
 Hamilton/Upper James Rapid Transit Corridor
 Triplinx, integrated web-based trip planning tool for the Greater Toronto and Hamilton Area 
 Carbon Footprint Calculator
 Bicycle promotion initiatives
 $2.1 million-$3.2 million for safe/secure bike storage
 $1.0 million-$1.8 million to expand bike/bus rack program

On December 4, 2007, the GTTA adopted the name 'Metrolinx' for public use. At the same time, it launched a new web site, and released the first of its series of green papers on transportation issues, part of the process of creating the Regional Transportation Plan. From June 2008, Metrolinx began using a new logo in printed and electronic communications.

Timeline
2008:
 December 17:  Metrolinx announced that, together with twelve municipalities, it had made a collective bus purchase for 160 buses.
 2009:
 March 30: the Ontario government introduced legislation to merge GO Transit and Metrolinx into a single entity, with "Metrolinx" as its legal name. The legislation received royal assent on May 14, 2009, taking immediate effect. This resulted in the replacement of the previous board structure with a new one in which 15 private-sector appointees are made by the province.  The legislation makes other changes to Metrolinx's powers and abilities. GO's trackage used to be owned entirely by Canada's two major commercial railways: the large majority by the Canadian National Railway (CNR) and the remainder by Canadian Pacific Railway (CPR). Before Metrolinx's creation, GO Transit had only acquired partial ownership of the Lakeshore East, Barrie, Stouffville and Milton lines. However, ever since its inception Metrolinx has been expanding its ownership of the rail corridors on which GO Transit operates by acquiring nonessential rail lines from both CN and CP.
 April 8: Metrolinx announced that it had acquired the Weston Subdivision, part of the Kitchener line, then known as the Georgetown line, for $160 million from CN.
 June 27: Metrolinx division GO Transit introduced summer weekend GO train service between Toronto and Niagara Falls.
 December 15: Metrolinx announced that it had acquired the lower portion of the Newmarket subdivision for $68 million from CN, giving it full ownership of the Barrie line.
2010:
March 31: Metrolinx announced that it had acquired a key piece of track from CN for $168 million. This purchase was for a portion of the Oakville subdivision from Union station to 30th Street in Etobicoke just west of GO's Willowbrook Rail Maintenance Facility.
July 30: Metrolinx announced its plan to build, own and operate the air rail link between Union Station and Toronto Pearson International Airport.
2011:
January 24: Metrolinx and the Regional Municipality of York awarded contracts for early construction on work on the York Viva Bus Rapid Transit way.
March 30: Metrolinx announced that it had acquired the portion of the Kingston line on which that GO trains operate from CN for $299 million, giving them full ownership of the Lakeshore East line.
 June 16: Metrolinx announced that, together with 12 municipalities, it purchased 287 new transit buses.
August 24: Metrolinx division GO Transit announced that the Presto card was available across its entire GTHA network.
December 19: GO Transit expanded its weekday GO train service to include stations in Kitchener-Waterloo and Guelph.
2012:
 January 29: Metrolinx division GO Transit opened the new Allandale Waterfront GO Station in Barrie.
 March 27: Metrolinx announced that it had acquired key portions of multiple subdivisions from CN for $310.5 million. This purchase included the southern portions of the Bala subdivision up to CN's main east-west freight line the York subdivision, part of the Richmond Hill line and a large portion of the Oakville subdivision from 30th Street in Etobicoke to a point just west of Fourth line in Oakville.
May 10: GO Transit announced summer weekend and GO train service between Toronto and Barrie.
November 15: GO Transit launched the GO Train Service Guarantee, a fare credit policy for train delays.
 November 29: Metrolinx announced the Next Wave of Big Move projects.
2013:
 January 5: GO Transit began serving the new Acton GO Station.
 March 22:, Metrolinx completed an additional purchase of the Oakville subdivision from CN for $52.5 million. This purchase was for the portion from Fourth Line in Oakville to a point just east of where CN's freight main line joins the Oakville Subdivision in Burlington.
 April 13: Presto's smart farecard is available across the entire OC Transpo network in Ottawa.
 May 27, 2013, Metrolinx announced its Investment Strategy, a series of recommendations for sustaining transit growth in the region.
 June: Metrolinx had ownership of 68% of the corridors on which it operates, up from 6% in 1998. It has complete ownership of the Barrie, Stouffville and Lakeshore East lines and majority ownership of the Lakeshore West line (to a point just west of Burlington GO station) and Richmond Hill line (to Doncaster Junction, a point in between Old Cummer and Langstaff GO stations). Metrolinx owns comparatively small portions of the Kitchener and Milton lines, a situation that is unlikely to change as the lines are heavily used by freight traffic.
 June 5: Metrolinx crews began tunnelling the western underground portion of the Eglinton Crosstown light rail transit line.
 June 28: GO Transit introduced its biggest expansion in 46 years with 30-minute service on the Lakeshore lines.
 November 29: Metrolinx opened the Strachan Avenue underpass, allowing GO trains to operate below Strachan Ave. without disrupting road traffic. That same day, Metrolinx and the City of Mississauga announced the start of construction for the west segment of the Mississauga Transitway, scheduled for completion in 2016.
2014:
 February 28: Metrolinx revealed plans to increase train service to Hamilton and build the new West Harbour GO Station.
March 31: Metrolinx division Presto announced that one million transit riders were using the electronic fare card across the GTHA and Ottawa.
July 17: it was reported that Metrolinx had purchased stations at Georgetown, Brampton and Oshawa.
September 24: Metrolinx announced the purchase of the segment of the Kitchener line between Kitchener and Georgetown.
September 30: Metrolinx announced a partnership with Ivanhoé Cambridge to redevelop a new GO Bus Terminal that serves as a major transit, commercial and community hub.
2015
February 2: 36 GO stations and terminals began offering free WiFi to customers, providing coverage to approximately 80 per cent of customers.
February 12: Metrolinx announced a major expansion of Stouffville GO Line, adding additional tracks and improving the corridor to increase train.
March 10: Metrolinx announced a major expansion of Barrie GO line, adding additional tracks and improving the corridor to increase train capacity.
April 24: the new York GO Concourse was opened, a major part of the ongoing revitalization of Union Station, adding 50 per cent more capacity than the Bay Concourse.
June 6: the new Union-Pearson Express was launched, linking Toronto's Pearson International Airport with Union Station via a 25-minute two-stop express train.
July 9: the new West Harbour GO Station was opened in Hamilton, in time for the Toronto 2015 Pan Am Games.
2018:
January: Metrolinx claimed that their computer systems were hacked by North Korea, but did not provide any further details.
March 14: the Whitby Rail Maintenance Facility was substantially completed.

Responsibilities
The Metrolinx Act, 2006, formerly known as the Greater Toronto Transportation Authority Act, 2006, describes two of Metrolinx's primary responsibilities as being:
 to provide leadership in the co-ordination, planning, financing and development of an integrated, multi-modal transportation network that conforms with transportation policies of growth plans prepared and approved under the Places to Grow Act, 2005 applicable in the regional transportation area and complies with other provincial transportation policies and plans applicable in the regional transportation area, and
 to act as the central procurement agency for the procurement of local transit system vehicles, equipment, technologies and facilities and related supplies and services on behalf of Ontario municipalities.

The Big Move regional transportation plan
The Big Move: Transforming Transportation in the Greater Toronto and Hamilton Area was one of Metrolinx's first deliverables. It is a Regional Transportation Plan (RTP) including a rolling five-year capital plan and Investment Strategy for the GTHA. The plan builds on 52 GO train, subway, light rail and bus rapid transit projects proposed by the Government of Ontario in its MoveOntario 2020 plan announced on June 15, 2007, and includes new projects to support them.

A draft version of the Big Move was provided to Metrolinx on September 26, 2008, and a final version was approved on November 27, 2008.

Progress
Planning and construction is underway for some projects supporting the Regional Transportation Plan.

The three levels of government have provided $16 billion toward the first wave of projects, which are already underway. The next wave of projects were still in the planning phase at the time of the Big Move's release, and still subject to funding. Some of these projects have since attained approved funding, while others have not.

Funding investment strategy
The Metrolinx Investment Strategy, released in May 2013, proposes a series of 24 recommendations as part of a four-part plan to integrate transportation, growth and land use planning in the GTHA, maximize the value of public infrastructure investment, optimize system and network efficiencies, and dedicate new revenue sources for transit and transportation. These recommendations included revenue tools and policy recommendations.

Metrolinx also advised that funds raised by all the new taxes would be put in a dedicated transportation trust fund, one that would be administered by a board separate from Metrolinx.

The Investment Strategy was given to the government for consideration in 2013.

Current projects
, Metrolinx is managing the following public transit projects:

Commuter rail
 Bowmanville Expansion
 Davenport Diamond
Niagara Extension
 Two-way frequent electrified GO service along portions of certain corridors (a project also known as Regional Express Rail)

Rapid transit
 Dundas Street bus rapid transit
 Durham–Scarborough bus rapid transit
 Line 5 Eglinton
 Line 5 West extension
 Line 6 Finch West
 Hamilton LRT
 Hurontario LRT
 Mississauga Transitway
 Ontario Line
 Line 2 Scarborough Subway Extension
 Viva Rapidways (last expansion opened on December 20, 2020, for Yonge Street Rapidway)
 Line 1 Yonge North Subway Extension

Hubs
 Caledonia Station
 Highway 407 Bus Terminal
 Kennedy station
 Kipling Transit Hub for MiWay and GO Transit (opened January 4, 2021)
 Mount Dennis Mobility Hub
 Union Station renovation and expansion (Bay concourse reopened July 27, 2021)
 Union Station Bus Terminal (opened December 5, 2020)

Operating divisions

GO Transit

GO Transit is the inter-regional public transit system serving the Greater Toronto and Hamilton Area and the Greater Golden Horseshoe. GO carries over 65 million passengers a year using an extensive network of train and bus services; rail service is provided by diesel locomotives pulling trains of unpowered double-deck passenger cars, while most bus service is provided by inter-city coaches.

Canada's first such public system, GO Transit began regular passenger service on May 23, 1967, under the auspices of the Ontario Ministry of Transportation. Over time it has been constituted in a variety of public-sector configurations, but it became an operating division of Metrolinx in 2009.

New and improved GO service is a top transit priority listed in the regional transportation plan. Since 2009, GO Transit has introduced seasonal train service to Barrie and Niagara Falls, extended service to Kitchener and Lake Simcoe, opened four new stations at Acton, Guelph Central, Allandale Waterfront, and Hamilton West Harbour. Since June 2013, GO Trains along the Lakeshore rail lines run every 30 minutes, making the biggest expansion in GO Transit history.

Union Pearson Express

The trains run every fifteen minutes, seven days a week, and are predicted to eliminate 1.5 million car trips annually. The duration of this trip is approximately 25 minutes.

The line uses a Metrolinx-owned railway rail corridor now used by GO Transit, as part of the Georgetown South Project to allow for additional train traffic. The UP Express shares the same path as trains on the Kitchener line, before splitting off onto a separate subdivision just west of the Etobicoke North Station. It stops at the existing Bloor and Weston GO Stations.

Presto

The Presto card, originally known as the GTA Farecard, is a smartcard-based fare payment system for public transit systems in Ontario, including those in the Greater Toronto and Hamilton Area and Ottawa. The Presto system is designed to support the use of one common farecard for fare payment on various public transit systems, through electronic readers that calculate the correct fare and deduct it from a preloaded balance.

Presto will also centralize its operational logistics, such as farecard procurement, reporting services, and a customer call centre. The system was trialled from June 25, 2007, to September 30, 2008. Full implementation began in November 2009. It will be rolled out across the province in stages. Presto now serves over a million customers in the GTHA and Ottawa.

By January 2017, Presto had been fully implemented on the following 11 transit systems:
 Brampton Transit
 Burlington Transit
 Durham Region Transit
 GO Transit
 Hamilton Street Railway
 MiWay
 Oakville Transit
 OC Transpo
 Toronto Transit Commission
 UP Express 
 York Region Transit

Other programs
Smart Commute is a program that, with the support of local municipalities, endeavours to fight climate change by reducing traffic congestion and increasing transit efficiency. Employers and employees in the GTHA can explore and have assistance with different commuting options, such as carpooling, transit, cycling, walking, remote work, and flextime. The program is delivered through local transportation management associations.

Originally conducted under the Ontario Ministry of Transportation in 2006, the Transit Procurement Initiative involves Metrolinx assisting municipal transit operators with the procurement of vehicles, equipment, technologies, facilities and related supplies. The goal of the program is to reduce per unit cost, increase unit quality, and provide an open and transparent procurement process for municipal transit operators. To date, the program has supported 21 municipalities and transit agencies, has purchased over 400 buses, and has saved an estimated $5 million.

Metrolinx also seeks partnerships with individuals and the community, and offers financial support for proposed projects that support transit.

Smart Commute includes various programs for commuters, including carpool ride-matching, walking and cycling, and teleworking programs.

In July 2015, a $4.9 million plan was announced to double the size of Bike Share Toronto by 2016. The bicycles and docking stations will be owned by Metrolinx, while the system will continue to be operated by the Toronto Parking Authority.

In 2021, Metrolinx dropped its hydrail program.

Criticism
Metrolinx has been criticized for not having enough executive power in planning transit outside of municipal politics, despite being established to take political delay out of transportation planning. After Rob Ford was elected mayor of Toronto in December 2010, he declared Transit City, the provincially funded transit expansion plan of light rail lines, dead. These lines were a large component of Metrolinx's 2008 Big Move. Metrolinx was again criticized when, in January 2012, its CEO declared that it would bend to what Toronto City Council wanted regarding how the Eglinton-Scarborough Crosstown LRT line should be built. The issue centred on whether the more suburban stretches of the line, from Laird Drive to Kennedy Station, should be built at street level instead of a more costly underground alignment. Metrolinx was criticized after a Toronto Star investigation found that the agency has approved two transit stations, Kirby and Lawrence East, for the GO Regional Express Rail expansion due to political pressure from the Ministry of Transportation. Kirby is in the Vaughan riding of the then-transportation minister, Steven Del Duca, and Lawrence East in Scarborough is part of Toronto mayor John Tory's "SmartTrack" plan, his signature campaign promise. Both stations were not recommended to be constructed in the near term by an external consultant, AECOM, hired by Metrolinx. However, they were both shortlisted to begin construction. Ontario's auditor general found that Metrolinx incurred about $436 million "in sunk and additional" – unrecoverable – costs between 2009 and 2018 due to numerous changes in transit plans.

In Ottawa, where Metrolinx is only involved in fare collection, Jim Watson, the mayor of Ottawa, has criticized Metrolinx for wanting to increase the fee it collects from 2% to 10%, and characterized it as a monopoly.

Governance
Metrolinx used to be governed by a board consisting of various appointees from the Ontario government and the regions within the GTHA. After the passage of the Greater Toronto and Hamilton Area Transit Implementation Act, 2009 merging Metrolinx and GO Transit, the Metrolinx board structure was changed, with politicians specifically prohibited from serving.

The Metrolinx president and CEO is Phil Verster (April 2020), who also serves as a member of the board of directors.

Metrolinx's board of directors is composed of not more than 15 persons (including the CEO) appointed by the Ontario's lieutenant governor on the recommendation of the Ontario Minister of Transportation. As of January 2018, the chair was Donald Wright.

Notable former staff include Robert Prichard (chair 2010–2018; CEO and president 2009–2010), and Rob MacIsaac (chair 2006–2010).

See also 

 Metrolinx mobility hubs
 Public transport in Canada

References

External links

 

 
Crown corporations of Ontario